The Southwestern Proving Ground Building No. 5 is an ammunition storage bunker at 259 Hempstead County Road 279 in Oakhaven, Arkansas, northwest of the city of Hope.

It is located on property that was once part of the Southwestern Proving Ground, a major military facility during World War II whose largest portion was transformed into Hope Municipal Airport.

Building No. 5 is a single-story concrete structure with a rounded roof, covered in earth, and with a heavy steel door facing northwest.  It is one of three ammunition bunkers built on the proving ground (the others, Building Nos. 32 and 33, also survive).  The building is used as storage by a private owner.

The building was listed on the National Register of Historic Places in 2010.

See also
Southwestern Proving Ground Building No. 4, located on the same property
Southwestern Proving Ground Building No. 129, located on the same property
Southwestern Proving Ground Officers Quarters Historic District
National Register of Historic Places listings in Hempstead County, Arkansas

References

Military facilities on the National Register of Historic Places in Arkansas
Military installations established in 1941
Buildings and structures in Hempstead County, Arkansas
National Register of Historic Places in Hempstead County, Arkansas